Fayolism was a theory of management that analyzed and synthesized the role of management in organizations, developed around 1900 by the French manager and management theorist Henri Fayol (1841–1925). It was through Fayol's work as a philosopher of administration that he contributed most widely to the theory and practice of organizational management.

Research and teaching of management 
Fayol successfully was CEO of Compagnie de Commentry-Fourchambault-Decazeville from 1888 on, and methodically analysed how this worked. He believed by focusing on managerial practices he could minimize misunderstandings and increase efficiency in organizations. He enlightened managers on how to accomplish their managerial duties, and the practices in which they should engage. In his book General and Industrial Management (published in French in 1916, then published in English in 1949), Fayol outlined his theory of general management, which he believed could be applied to the administration of myriad industries. His concern was with the administrative apparatus (or functions of administration), and to that end he presented his administrative theory, that is, principles and elements of management.

He believed in control and strict, treelike, command chain; unity of commands, that is, workers getting their orders from just one person above and no other (not even the boss' boss) is one of his major motto. He thinks production and productivity are important, but not all that matters: half a dozen other departments (selling and buying, finances, etc.) and other focus (safety, unity of purpose and harmony between workers, getting better at having things done, etc.) are just as important to achieve success. However, through reading General and Industrial Management, it is apparent that Fayol advocated a flexible approach to management, one he believed could be applied to any circumstance whether in the home, the workplace, or within the state. He stressed the importance and the practice of forecasting and planning in order to apply these ideas and techniques, which demonstrated his ability and emphasis in being able to adapt to any sort of situation. In General and Industrial Management he outlines an agenda whereby, under an accepted theory of management, every citizen is exposed and taught some form of management education and allowed to exercise management abilities first at school and later on in the workplace.

Fayol vs. Frederick Taylor's Scientific Management
Fayol has been regarded by many as the father of the modern operational management theory, and his ideas have become a fundamental part of modern management concepts. Fayol is often compared to Frederick Winslow Taylor who developed Scientific Management.  Taylor's system of scientific management is the cornerstone of classical theory. Fayol was also a classical theorist, and while Taylor knew nothing of Fayol, Fayol read Taylor and referred to him in his writing. He considered him a visionary and pioneer in the management of organizations, and praised him, but also criticized some points. 

However, Fayol differed from Taylor in his focus. Taylor's main focus was on the task, whereas Fayol was more concerned with management. Taylor's Scientific Management deals with the efficient organization of production in the context of a competitive enterprise that is concerned with controlling its production costs, whereas Fayol leaves this to the technical executives and operatives, and put emphasis on the leadership, orderly organization, communication and harmony between departments etc. that he calls administration and, according to Fayol, applies to just every business and organisation (including non-profit, churches, armies, etc.) whether small or big. Another difference between the two theorists is their treatment of workers. Fayol appears to have slightly more respect for the worker than Taylor had, as evidenced by Fayol's proclamation that workers may indeed be motivated by more than just money, and his practice to give them opportunities to learn and move up the ladder. Fayol also argued for equity in the treatment of workers. He also discuss how workers should get their wages: should this be fixed, or should they get bonus payments, or even some part of the dividends; should this be for a period of time, for a number of task accomplished, or a number of products done?

According to Claude George (1968), a primary difference between Fayol and Taylor was that Taylor viewed management processes from the bottom up, while Fayol viewed it from the top down. In Fayol's book General and Industrial Management, Fayol wrote that  He suggests that Taylor has staff analysts and advisors working with individuals at lower levels of the organization to identify the ways to improve efficiency. According to Fayol, the approach results in a "negation of the principle of unity of command". Fayol criticized Taylor’s functional management in this way.  Those eight, Fayol said, were 
route clerks,
instruction card men
cost and time clerks
gang bosses
speed bosses
inspectors
repair bosses, and the
shop disciplinarian (p. 68).
This, he said, was an unworkable situation, and that Taylor must have somehow reconciled the dichotomy in some way not described in Taylor's works, but crucial for it to actually work on the field. 

Fayol's desire for teaching a generalized theory of management stemmed from the belief that each individual of an organization at one point or another takes on duties that involve managerial decisions. Unlike Taylor, however, who believed management activity was the exclusive duty of an organizations dominant class. Fayol's approach was more in sync with his idea of Authority, which stated, "...that the right to give orders should not be considered without the acceptance and understanding of responsibility."

Noted as one of the early fathers of the Human Relations movements, Fayol expressed ideas and practices different from Taylor, in that they showed flexibility and adaptation, and stressed the importance of interpersonal interaction among employees.

Fayol's Principles of Management 
During the early 20th century, Fayol developed 14 principles of management to help managers manage their affairs more effectively. Organizations in technologically advanced countries interpret these principles quite differently from the way they were interpreted during Fayol's time as well. These differences in interpretation are in part a result of the cultural challenges managers face when implementing this framework. The fourteen principles are: 
Division of work
Delegation of authority and responsibilities
Discipline
Unity of commands
Unity of direction
Interrelation between individual interests and common organizational goals
Compensation package
Centralization
Scalar chains
Order
Equity
Job guarantee
Initiatives
Team-Spirit or Esprit de corps

Fayol goes on to describe how each organizational component has certain properties attached to it, depending on its role in contribution to the organization or group. This essential function, or activities, correspond to a set of abilities that are appropriate in order to carry out the duties associated with the properties of this essential function, or activities. In order to match this specified set of abilities that are required for the organizational role, a profile of which number of requisite abilities necessary for the role in question has to be established. This thesis has since been subject to application in 21st century organizational theory.

Fayol's Elements (or functions) of Management 
Within his theory, Fayol outlined five elements of management that depict the kinds of behaviors managers should engage in so that the goals and objectives of an organization are effectively met. The five elements of management are:

Planning:  creating a plan of action for the future, determining the stages of the plan and the technology necessary to implement it. Deciding in advance what to do, how to do it, when to do it, and who should do it. It maps the path from where the organization is to where it wants to be. The planning function involves establishing goals and arranging them in a logical order. Administrators engage in both short-range and long-range planning.
Organizing:  Once a plan of action is designed, managers need to provide everything necessary to carry it out; including raw materials, tools, capital and human resources. Identifying responsibilities, grouping them into departments or divisions, and specifying organizational relationships.
Command:  Managers need to implement the plan.  They must have an understanding of the strengths and weaknesses of their personnel. Leading people in a manner that achieves the goals of the organization requires proper allocation of resources and an effective support system.  Directing requires exceptional interpersonal skills and the ability to motivate people. One of the crucial issues in directing is the correct balance between staff needs and production.
Coordination:  High-level managers must work to "harmonize" all the activities to facilitate organizational success.  Communication is the prime coordinating mechanism. Synchronizes the elements of the organization and must take into account delegation of authority and responsibility and span of control within units.
Control:  The final element of management involves the comparison of the activities of the personnel to the plan of action, it is the evaluation component of management. Monitoring function that evaluates quality in all areas and detects potential or actual deviations from the organization's plan, ensuring high-quality performance and satisfactory results while maintaining an orderly and problem-free environment. Controlling includes information management, measurement of performance, and institution of corrective actions.

Effects of Written Communication
Fayol believed that animosity and unease within the workplace occurred among employees in different departments.  Many of these "misunderstandings" were thought to be caused by improper communication, mainly through letters (or in present-day emails).  Among scholars of organizational communication and psychology, letters were perceived to induce or solidify a hierarchical structure within the organization.  Through this type of vertical communication, many individuals gained a false feeling of importance.  Furthermore, it gave way to selfish thinking and eventual conflict among employees in the workplace.

This concept was expressed in Fayol's book, General and Industrial Management, by stating," in some firms... employees in neighboring departments with numerous points of contact, or even employees within a department, who could quite easily meet, communicate with each other in writing... there is to be observed a certain amount of animosity prevailing between different departments or different employees within a department. The system of written communication usually brings this result. There is a way of putting an end to this deplorable system ... and that is to forbid all communication in writing which could easily and advantageously be replaced by verbal ones."

Administrative theory in the modern workplace
Fayol believed that managerial practices were key to predictability and efficiency in organizations. The administrative theory views communication as a necessary ingredient to successful management and many of Fayol's practices are still alive in today's workplace. The elements and principles of management can be found in modern organizations in several ways: as accepted practices in some industries, as revamped versions of the original principles or elements, or as remnants of the organization's history to which alternative practices and philosophies are being offered.

See also 

 Innovation management
 Management science
 Managerial economics
 Organization theory

References

Further reading 
 Breeze, John D., and Frederick C. Miner. "Henri Fayol: A New Definition of "Administration"." Academy of Management Proceedings. Vol. 1980. No. 1. Academy of Management, 1980.
 Fayol, Henri, and John Adair Coubrough. Industrial and general administration. (1930).
 Fayol, Henri. General and industrial management. (1954).
 Fayol, Henri. General Principles of Management. (1976).
 Modaff, Daniel P., Sue DeWine, and Jennifer A. Butler. Organizational communication: Foundations, challenges, and misunderstandings. Pearson/Allyn & Bacon, 2008.
 Pearson, Norman M. "Fayolism as the necessary complement of Taylorism." American Political Science Review 39.01 (1945): 68-80.
 Parker, Lee D., and Philip A. Ritson. "Revisiting Fayol: anticipating contemporary management." British Journal of Management 16.3 (2005): 175-194.
 Pugh, Derek S. "Modern organization theory: A psychological and sociological study." Psychological Bulletin 66.4 (1966): 235.
 Reid, Donald. "The genesis of fayolism." Sociologie du travail 28.1 (1986): 75-93.
 Carl A Rodrigues.  (2001). "Fayol's 14 principles of management then and now: A framework for managing today's organizations effectively." Management Decision, 39(10), 880-889.
 Wren, Daniel A. "Was Henri Fayol a Real Manager?." Academy of Management Proceedings. Vol. 1990. No. 1. Academy of Management, 1990.

Management science